The Blue Lagoon is a geothermal spa in southwestern Iceland. The spa is located in a lava field near Grindavík and in front of Mount Þorbjörn on Reykjanes Peninsula, in a location favourable for geothermal power, and is supplied by water used in the nearby Svartsengi geothermal power station.

Description
The water's milky blue shade is due to its high silica content. The silica forms soft white mud on the bottom of the lake which bathers rub on themselves. The water is also rich in salts and algae.

The water temperature in the bathing and swimming area of the lagoon averages . Guests are required to shower bare naked prior to using the geothermal spa. The communal showers are split up by gender. Children age 8 and under are only allowed entry with the use of arm floaters, provided free of charge. The lagoon is not suitable for children under the age of 2 years. The lagoon is accessible for wheelchair users with a ramp that extends into the water and a shower chair. There is also a private changing room available for those with special needs.

History

Water source
The lagoon is man-made. The water is a byproduct from the nearby geothermal power plant Svartsengi where superheated water is vented from the ground near a lava flow and used to run turbines that generate electricity. After going through the turbines, the steam and hot water passes through a heat exchanger to provide heat for a municipal water heating system. Then the water is fed into the lagoon.

The rich mineral content is provided by the underground geological layers and pushed up to the surface by the hot water (at about  pressure and  temperature) used by the plant. After the minerals have formed a deposit, the water reinfiltrates the ground, but the deposits render the ground impermeable over time, so the plant needs to continuously dig new ponds in the nearby lava field.

The water renews every 2 days. The average pH is 7.5 and the salt content is 2.5%. Very few organisms live in the water apart from some blue-green algae, despite the water not being artificially disinfected it contains no fecal bacteria, environmental bacteria, fungi, or plants.

Baths 
Shortly after the opening of the Svartsengi power plant in 1976, the runoff water had made pools. In 1981, a psoriasis patient bathed in the water and noted that the water alleviated his symptoms and the lagoon subsequently became popular. Bathing facilities opened in 1987 and in 1992 the Blue Lagoon company was established.

Studies made in the 1990s confirmed that the lagoon had a beneficial effect on the skin disease psoriasis. A psoriasis clinic was opened in 1994 and in 1995, the Blue Lagoon company began marketing skin products containing silica, algae, and salt.

The lagoon recorded 1.3 million visitors in 2017, up from 919,000 visitors in 2015. The company had a revenue of €102 million and a profit of €31 million in 2017. It has over 600 employees. The entry fee is from $64.

See also
 Balneotherapy

References

External links

 
 
 Information from Reykjavik's tourist organization
 Blue Lagoon panoramic virtual tour
 Blue Lagoon Discover Iceland Tours

Hot springs of Iceland
Spas
Tourist attractions in Iceland
Reykjanes